Mary of Anjou may refer to:

Maria of Anjou, Queen of Majorca (1290–1346/47), queen consort of Majorca
Maria of Calabria (1328–1366), titular empress of Latin Empire of Constantinople
Mary, Queen of Hungary (1371–1395), queen regnant of Hungary
Marie of Anjou (1404–1463), queen consort of France